Invasion is a BBC documentary series in which Dan Cruickshank examines attempts and plans to invade Britain and Ireland over the years by exploring coastal fortresses and defensive structures around the coast of the country to discover their military heritage. It was first broadcast on BBC Two in October 2001.

First aired on 28 October 2001, this three part series examines the portrayal of Britain as an impregnable self-sufficient island fortress and seeks to dispel this popular myth and provide an argument that Britain is a nation whose history is instead defined by the fear of invasion.

In episode one, Fortress Britain, Cruickshank visits the sites of some little-known invasion attempts.  In episode two, The Bogeyman Is Coming, Cruickshank looks at Britain's response to the threat of French invasion by Napoleon's army in 1804. In the final episode, Battle for Britain, Cruickshank examines how Britain reinvented itself as a fortified encampment under the threat of German invasion during World War II.

Companion book

External links
Nelson, Napoleon and the French Threat by Dan Cruickshank
World War One: A New Enemy by Dan Cruickshank
The German Threat to Britain in World War Two by Dan Cruickshank
The Threat of Invasion – An Overview by Dr Niall Barr
 

2001 British television series debuts
2001 British television series endings
2000s British documentary television series
BBC television documentaries about history
2000s British television miniseries
English-language television shows